John Blackwell was an English soldier and football referee. He officiated the 1940 friendly between Mandatory Palestine and Lebanon, which ended in a 5–1 victory to the home side. He was also part of the British Army in Palestine in 1940.

References

Year of birth missing
Year of death missing
English football referees
British Army officers
British expatriates in Mandatory Palestine
British Army personnel of World War II